This is a list of the number ones of the UK Independent Singles and Album Breakers Charts.

 List of UK Independent Album Breakers Chart number ones of the 2000s
 List of UK Independent Album Breakers Chart number ones of the 2010s
 List of UK Independent Album Breakers Chart number ones of the 2020s
 List of UK Independent Singles Breakers Chart number ones of the 2000s
 List of UK Independent Singles Breakers Chart number ones of the 2010s
 List of UK Independent Singles Breakers Chart number ones of the 2020s

See also
 Lists of UK Independent Albums Chart number ones
 Lists of UK Independent Singles Chart number ones

External links
Independent Albums Breakers at the Official Charts Company
Independent Singles Breakers at the Official Charts Company

Indie Breakers